The 1891 Cleveland Spiders season was a season in American baseball. They finished with a 65–74 record and a fifth-place finish in the National League.

The Spiders moved to a new ballpark in 1891. League Park was financed by Spiders owner Frank Robison, and it would be the team's home for the remainder of their existence. It would also be home to the Cleveland Indians.

The Spiders also had a new manager. Patsy Tebeau, the team's starting third baseman, was named manager midway through the season. He remained the Spiders manager until his contract was reassigned to the St. Louis Perfectos before the 1899 season.

Regular season

Season standings

Record vs. opponents

Opening Day lineup

Roster

Player stats

Batting

Starters by position 
Note: Pos = Position; G = Games played; AB = At bats; H = Hits; Avg. = Batting average; HR = Home runs; RBI = Runs batted in

Other batters 
Note: G = Games played; AB = At bats; H = Hits; Avg. = Batting average; HR = Home runs; RBI = Runs batted in

Pitching

Starting pitchers 
Note: G = Games pitched; IP = Innings pitched; W = Wins; L = Losses; ERA = Earned run average; SO = Strikeouts

Relief pitchers 
Note: G = Games pitched; W = Wins; L = Losses; SV = Saves; ERA = Earned run average; SO = Strikeouts

References 

Cleveland Spiders seasons
Cleveland Spiders season
Cleveland Spiders